Harley Allen (February 12, 1930April 3, 1993), better known as Red Allen, was an American bluegrass singer and guitarist known for his powerful tenor voice.

Biography
Allen, born in Pigeon Roost Hollow, near Hazard, Kentucky, grew up in the music-rich hills of eastern Kentucky, and following a stint in the Marines, settled in Dayton, Ohio in 1949, where he began performing professionally.  In 1952, Allen discovered a young teenage mandolin virtuoso named Frank Wakefield, who had moved to Dayton from Harriman, Tennessee.  Soon Wakefield became a member of Allen's first band, the Blue Ridge Mountain Boys.  The band also included the legendary Ohio 5-string banjo player Noah Crase.  They worked the local bars along Dayton's Fifth Street as well as the rough blue collar taverns which made up the Ohio and Michigan bluegrass circuit at the time.  Allen first came to broader public attention in 1956, when he joined the Osborne Brothers to fill out one of the most influential vocal trios in the history of country music.  Allen made his first recordings with the Osborne Brothers on July 1, 1956 when they recorded four songs, including "Ruby," "Ho Honey Ho" and "Once More."  "Once More" has been called a "landmark in three-part vocal harmony." The Osbornes and Red Allen were now featured cast members on the World's Original Jamboree radio show over WWVA in Wheeling, West Virginia. In 1958, Allen left the group and returned to Dayton.

Frank Wakefield, meanwhile, had also returned to Dayton, having himself garnered national exposure with the release of some hot-selling singles recorded in Detroit the year beforeincluding the seminal mandolin instrumental "New Camptown Races," and also touring with Jimmy Martin and the Sunny Mountain Boys.  Allen and Wakefield then formed their second partnership, resulting in some single recordings made with local banjo player Red Spurlock and released under the professional name The Red Heads on the BMC label.  The records were poorly marketed, and Wakefield left Ohio in late 1959 to explore better career opportunities in the bluegrass-rich DC–Baltimore area.  In 1960 Allen followed suit, and the two reunited as Red Allen, and The Kentuckians.  The Washington, D.C. area had a thriving bluegrass scene including such artists as Buzz Busby and the Bayou Boys, The Country Gentlemen, Don Reno and Red Smiley and the Tennessee Cutups, The Stoneman Family and Wilma Lee and Stoney Cooper.  Allen and Wakefield were soon performing regularly at area night spots and also secured a regular Sunday afternoon broadcast over station WDON in Wheaton, Maryland.  On July 4, 1961, the band was among a small handful invited to perform at Bill Clifton's first-ever one day Bluegrass Festival held at Luray, Virginia.  In November 1961, Allen and Wakefield recorded six sides in Nashville that included banjo legend Don Reno, fiddle master Chubby Wise and bassist John Palmer on the Starday label including the popular "Trouble 'Round My Door" and "Beautiful Blue Eyes."  By 1963 Allen, Wakefield and their band had performed at both Carnegie Hall and at the trendy Gerde's Folk City club in New York City.  In addition to Wakefield, at various times the touring version of The Kentuckians included Tom Morgan on bass, Pete Kuykendall, Bill Keith or Ralph Robinson on banjo and Scott Stoneman or Billy Baker on fiddle.

In 1964 Allen, Wakefield and their band made a much-admired album for Folkways, entitled simply Bluegrass, produced by young David Grisman, an admirer of Allen and mandolin student of Wakefield's.  The recording showed a larger public that Allen was a true disciple of the "high lonesome sound" associated with Bill Monroe.  At his best, Allen drenched his material in emotion, each song propelled by his surging rhythm-guitar playing.  As he later said, "Bluegrass is sad music.  It's always been sad and the people that's never lived it, it'll take them a long time to know what it is."

After Frank Wakefield's departure from the band in 1965 to join the Greenbriar Boys, Allen replaced him with Wakefield protégé David Grisman and later recorded for County Records and King Records with noted banjo player J.D. Crowe.  The collaboration with Crowe, entitled Bluegrass Holiday, featured some of Allen's strongest vocal performances.  Allen's prominence on the record resulted in a sound quite distinct from the material made by Crowe and his Kentucky Mountain Boys.  Grisman, who would go on to pioneer a contemporary style of acoustic music called DAWG music, later said that by hiring him for the Kentuckians, Allen gave the younger man "a college education in bluegrass music."

Allen's sons Ronnie, Greg, Neal and Harley performed and recorded as the Allen Brothers, both with and without their father, throughout the 1970s and 1980s.

Death and legacy
Allen died on April 3, 1993 in Dayton, Ohio. He is buried at Highland Memorial Cemetery in Miamisburg, Ohio.

Allen was inducted into the Society for the Preservation of Bluegrass Music of America hall of fame in 1995. In 2005, Red Allen was inducted into the IBMA Bluegrass Hall of Fame.

Vocal arrangements
Until the Osbornes' 1958 hit "Once More", the typical arrangement called for a "lead" singer to provide the melody with a tenor singing a higher part, and a baritone below.  "Once More", which reached No. 13 on the charts, comprised a lead sung by the highest voice of the group, mandolinist Bobby Osborne.  Allen sang the baritone just below the melody and banjo player Sonny Osborne provided the tenor a full octave below its place in a traditional arrangement.  The result, as the Osbornes themselves observed, allowed singers to mimic the sliding tonal effects of the pedal steel guitar.  Contemporary singers using this device include Rhonda Vincent.

Selected discography

Albums

Compilations

See also
Harley Allen
The Osborne Brothers
Frank Wakefield
Bill Monroe

References

External links
 
 
 Red Allen Discography at Smithsonian Folkways
 Article by Ivan Tribe
 Bluegrass Museum

1930 births
1993 deaths
American folk singers
Old-time musicians
American gospel singers
Bluegrass musicians from Kentucky
American bluegrass guitarists
American male guitarists
20th-century American singers
20th-century American guitarists
People from Perry County, Kentucky
Country musicians from Kentucky
20th-century American male musicians
Musicians from Washington, D.C.
Musicians from Dayton, Ohio